Mohanur block is a revenue block in the Namakkal district of Tamil Nadu, India. It has a total of 25 panchayat villages.

List of Panchayat in Mohanur Block
Andapuram 
Aniyapuram
Arasanatham
Ariyur
Aroor
Chinna Pethampatti
Kalipalayam
Komaripalayam
K.Pudupalayam
Kumarapalayam
Lathuvadi
Madakasampatti
Manapalli
Nanjai Edayar
N.Pudupatti
Olapalayam
Oruvandur
Parali
Peramandampalayam
Pettapalayam
Rasipalayam
Sengapalli
S.Valavanthi
Tholur
Valayappatti

References 
 

Revenue blocks of Namakkal district